Inertia is the second studio album by American rock band The Exies, released on January 7, 2003.  The video to the first single "My Goddess" was directed by hip hop video director Diane Martel. The concept of the video revolved around the band playing in front of oncoming traffic- some of which were doing speeds as high as 70 miles an hour. "My Goddess" was filmed on Highway 2 in Los Angeles County in the fall of 2002.  
 
It is their most successful album, reaching #115 on the Billboard 200. Inertia and their next studio album Head for the Door have sold over a combined 400,000 units.

Track listing 

The enhanced version of the CD also features a video of "My Goddess", a multimedia track displayed as an additional track by some software. The duration of this track is 2:49.
The song "Without" can be heard on the video game MVP Baseball 2003.

Personnel 
 Musical
 Scott Stevens - vocals, guitar
 David Walsh - vocals, guitar
 Freddy Herrera - bass guitar
 Dennis Wolfe - drums, percussion
 Matt Serletic - keyboards, background vocals, string arrangements, orchestration
 Noel Golden - background vocals
 Mike Fasano - percussion
 Bruce Dukov - concertmaster

 Technical
 Matt Serletic - producer
 Noel Golden - engineer, string engineer
 Jo Ann Thrailkill - executive producer
 Dean Serletic - A&R
 Lynn Oliver - A&R
 Christopher Wade Damerst - programming
 David Thoener - mixing
 Stewart Whitmore - digital editing
 Stephen Marcussen - mastering
 Phil Roland - pro-tools
 Craig Poole - guitar technician
 Jay Goin - assistant
 Sam Story - assistant
 Tosh Kasai - assistant
 Tony Green - assistant
 P.R. Brown - design
 William Hames - photography
 Jeff Garner - photography
 Danny Clinch - photography
 Keith Carter - photography

References 

2003 albums
The Exies albums
Virgin Records albums
Albums produced by Matt Serletic